Epcot Center Ultralight Flightpark  was a private-use ultralight airport located in Osceola County, 13 nautical miles (24 km) northwest of the central business district of Lake Buena Vista, Florida, United States. It was privately owned by the Walt Disney World Company, and was used to launch aircraft used in the "Skyleidoscope" and "Surprise in the Skies" shows at the Epcot theme park.

Although still listed active in FAA records as recently as September 2010, this facility closed for theme park use in 1992, when Surprise in the Skies ended. The land sat unused for nearly 10 years, when it was cleared for the second phase of Disney's Pop Century Resort, named the Legendary Years. Construction on the hotel was stopped after the September 11 attacks caused tourism to drop off.

The former airport is now the site of Disney's Art of Animation Resort, which opened in May 2012.

Facilities and aircraft
Epcot Center Ultralight Flightpark had one circular runway designated "ALL/WAY" with a 424 × 424 ft (129 × 129 m) turf surface. There were 20 aircraft based at this airport: 50% single-engine and 50% ultralight.

See also
 Walt Disney World Airport

References

Buildings and structures in Osceola County, Florida
Defunct airports in Florida
Transportation in Osceola County, Florida
Ultralight aviation
Walt Disney World
Epcot